Elliot Levey (born 6 December 1973) is an Olivier award winning actor.

Career 
Olivier award winner for the role of Herr Shultz in Cabaret.known for his work in British Theatre, he has performed at the Donmar Warehouse, Almeida and National Theatres.

His work has included the 2004 revival of the National Theatre production of His Dark Materials, the 2013 Donmar Warehouse production of Coriolanus playing the tribune Brutus alongside Mark Gatiss and Tom Hiddleston and the premieres of the musical Take Flight (2007, Menier Theatre) and the Bennett play The Habit of Art (2010, National Theatre), along with Robespierre in Danton's Death alongside Toby Stephens (2010, National Theatre) and Don John in a 2011 production of Much Ado About Nothing alongside David Tennant and Catherine Tate. In 2014 he played an American journalist in Ripper Street. In 2019 he played Judge Jeffreys in the ghost story  Martin's Close for the BBC.

Private life 
Levey was educated at Clifton College before reading philosophy at Oxford University, where he met Emma Loach (daughter of director Ken Loach), whom he later married and with whom he has three sons. He is Jewish.

References

External links
 
 Article in Prospect Magazine
 Article in The Guardian

Living people
1970s births
Alumni of the University of Oxford
English male film actors
English male stage actors
English male television actors
Jewish English male actors
Male actors from Leeds
People educated at Clifton College
Place of birth missing (living people)

https://m.youtube.com/watch?v=IwY8Pp0gggs

https://www.thejc.com/life-and-culture/all/its-right-and-proper-that-jews-play-jews-says-elliot-levey-as-he-prepares-for-his-role-in-a-new-production-of-good-6OSQu6G3VFTMpLEX1DYUYn